was a Japanese politician and educator who was the first woman appointed to the Cabinet of Japan when she became Minister of Health and Welfare in 1960.

Early life and education

Nakayama was born Masa Iida-Powers in Nagasaki, the daughter of Rodney H. Powers, an American businessman who had settled in Nagasaki in the 1860s, and his Japanese partner, Naka Iida. Masa attended Kwassui Jogakko, a mission school run by American Methodist missionaries. In 1911, she moved to the United States where she enrolled at Ohio Wesleyan University, graduating in 1916. Returning to Japan, she had a distinguished career as a high school and college educator prior to the outbreak of World War II. In 1923, Nakayama married Fukuzō Nakayama, a lawyer and politician who served in the lower house from 1932 to 1942, and later in the upper house after World War II.

Political career

In 1947, she was elected as a member of the House of Representatives in the Diet, representing the second district of Osaka Prefecture. In 1960, she became the first woman appointed to the Cabinet of Japan when she was appointed Minister of Health and Welfare by Prime Minister Hayato Ikeda. She served as a minister for five months, stepping down in December 1960.

Later life and death

Nakayama retired from the Diet in 1969, and was succeeded in her seat by her son, Masaaki. Nakayama died of throat cancer at an Osaka hospital on October 11, 1976, aged 85.

Family and descendants

Nakayama and her husband had two sons who also went into national politics: Representative Taro Nakayama and Representative Masaaki Nakayama. Representative Yasuhide Nakayama is her grandson and Masaaki's son.

References 

1891 births
1976 deaths
Ministers of Health and Welfare of Japan
Members of the House of Representatives (Japan)
Women government ministers of Japan
Female members of the House of Representatives (Japan)
Ohio Wesleyan University alumni
Spouses of Japanese politicians
Japanese educators
Japanese people of American descent
People from Nagasaki
Liberal Democratic Party (Japan) politicians
Deaths from laryngeal cancer
Deaths from cancer in Japan
Japanese women educators